Ricardo Louis (born March 23, 1994) is an American football wide receiver who is currently a free agent. He played college football at Auburn and was drafted by the Cleveland Browns in the fourth round of the 2016 NFL Draft.

High school and college career
Louis played football at Miami Beach Senior High School, where he played at quarterback, running back, wide receiver, tight end, linebacker, and safety. Excellent at all positions, his best performances came at a running back and receiver. In his senior year, he had 14 offensive touchdowns and 60 defensive tackles. ESPN ranked him the 21st best high school player in the nation in 2012.

He initially committed to Auburn University, then broke the commitment and committed to Florida State University before recommitting to Auburn.

His most memorable play was a  touchdown reception against the Georgia Bulldogs in 2013, known as the "Prayer at Jordan-Hare". The catch enabled the Tigers to win their division, enter the post-season, and make it into a national championship game. He led the Tigers in receptions (46 for ) and touchdowns (three) as a senior. Louis' collegiate career was also plagued by dropped passes, and he had six fumbles.

He was nominated his senior year for an ESPY Award.

Professional career
Louis attended the NFL Scouting Combine in February 2016. His performance there—an  broad jump (best among all attending wide receivers), a 40-yard dash of 4.43 seconds, and a vertical jump of —won him widespread attention, and significantly boosted his chances in the coming draft.

Cleveland Browns
The Cleveland Browns drafted Louis in the fourth round, 114th overall, in the 2016 NFL Draft. On May 31, he signed a four-year contract worth about $2.9 million, which included a signing bonus worth about $568,000. Louis incurred a hamstring injury during practice on August 13, keeping him out of the rest of the preseason. In 2018, Louis changed his number from #80 to #15, to make way for Jarvis Landry, who was traded previously from the Miami Dolphins. The Browns announced on July 25, 2018 that Louis would miss the entire 2018 season with a neck injury. Louis was waived by the Browns on April 1, 2019.

Miami Dolphins
On April 8, 2019, Louis signed with the Miami Dolphins. On May 16, 2019 the Dolphins placed Louis on injured reserve, ending his 2019 season. On February 4, 2020, Louis was re-signed to a one-year, $660,000 contract. The Dolphins released him on July 25, 2020. He was re-signed on August 8, 2020. He was released on September 1, 2020.

Saskatchewan Roughriders
Louis signed with the Saskatchewan Roughriders on June 21, 2021.

References

External links 
Cleveland Browns bio
Auburn Tigers bio

1994 births
Living people
Miami Beach Senior High School alumni
Players of American football from Miami
American football wide receivers
Auburn Tigers football players
Cleveland Browns players
Miami Dolphins players
Saskatchewan Roughriders players
Players of Canadian football from Miami